Darko Tresnjak is a director of plays, musicals, and opera, and winner of several awards, including the Tony Award. He was the artistic director of the Hartford Stage in Connecticut, United States.

Early life and education
Tresnjak is of Serbian heritage. Tresnjak and his mother moved from Zemun, Yugoslavia (modern-day Serbia) to Maryland in 1976. He graduated from Swarthmore College, became a US citizen, and received a master of fine arts degree from Columbia University.

Career
Around 2000 he wrote Princess Turandot, inspired by Carlo Gozzi's play written in 1762 (upon which Puccini's opera Turandot was based). Tresnjak's play was performed by the Blue Light Theater Company in New York City in December 2000.

He served as resident artistic director at Old Globe Theatre in San Diego, California, in 2009, and directed for eight summers at the Williamstown Theatre Festival in Massachusetts.

He was the artistic director at Hartford Stage in Hartford, Connecticut from the 2011–2012 season through the 2018–2019 season, where he commissioned The Man in the Case with Mikhail Baryshnikov and directed Kevin Bacon in Rear Window. He left the Hartford Stage for freelance work in June 2019, and was succeeded by Melia Bensussen.

He directed two productions on Broadway: A Gentleman's Guide to Love and Murder in 2013 and Anastasia in 2017.

He directed the Theatre for a New Audience production of Eugène Ionesco's The Killer in 2014 at the Polonsky Shakespeare Center, New York City.

Awards

2014: Tony Award for Direction of a Musical; and the Drama Desk Award, Outstanding Director of a Musical, for A Gentleman's Guide to Love and Murder.

2015: Obie Award for direction of The Killer.

Productions

Hartford Stage productions
Tresnjak's productions at Hartford Stage have included:
 Heartbreak House
 The Comedy of Errors
  Anastasia (which transferred to the Broadhurst Theatre on Broadway)
 Romeo and Juliet
 Rear Window
 Kiss Me, Kate
 Private Lives
 Hamlet
 Macbeth
 La Dispute
 Twelfth Night
 Breath and Imagination
 A Gentleman's Guide to Love and Murder (which transferred to the Walter Kerr Theatre on Broadway)
 The Tempest
 Bell, Book and Candle

Other theater and opera
 Samson et Dalila for The Metropolitan Opera (2018)
 Macbeth for Los Angeles Opera (2016)
 The Ghosts of Versailles for Los Angeles Opera (2015)
 The Killer for Theatre for a New Audience, New York City (2014)
 Der Zwerg for Los Angeles Opera (2011)
 Der Zerbrochene Krug for Los Angeles Opera (2008)
 City of Angels for Goodspeed Musicals (2011)
 Titus Andronicus for Stratford Shakespeare Festival (2011)
 The Merchant of Venice for Theatre for a New Audience and Complete Works (RSC festival)

References

External links
 
 
 

Serbian theatre directors
Drama Desk Award winners
Obie Award recipients 
American theatre directors
Living people
Tony Award winners
American theatre managers and producers
Columbia University School of the Arts alumni
Year of birth missing (living people)
American people of Serbian descent